Meena Khadikar is an Indian Marathi and Hindi language playback singer and composer. She is the second eldest daughter of Pt. Deenanath Mangeshkar and sister of singers Lata Mangeshkar, Asha Bhosle, Usha Mangeshkar and Hridaynath Mangeshkar.

Career (1952-2000) 
Meenatai’s work in Hindi cinema includes the songs Duniya mein hum aaye hain toh from Mother India (sung with Lata and Usha), Phagun aaya from Pilpili Saheb, the duet Aapne chheen liya dil with Mohammed Rafi in the film Farmaish, Hai mausam yeh mastaana, muskuraana, dil churaana from Aabroo and Are koi jaao ri piya ko bulao from Patrani.

But she’s best known for composing music for the Marathi industry, including a popular kids’ song and album Asawa Sunder Chocolatecha Bungla, which was later recorded in Bengali and Gujarati too. Meena’s children Yogesh and Rachna sang the original song. Her song Saang Saang Bholanaath is also well known.

Discography 
Marathi Songs
 "Ye Javali Ghe Priyasakhaya Bhagavanta" – Mansala Pankh Astat Composer Meena Mangeshkar Singer Lata Mangeshkar
 "Bavarle Mi Bavarle"- Ek Hota Raja Best of the Song

Hindi Songs
 "Phagun Aaya" – Pilpili Saheb
 "Hai Mausam Yeh Mastaana Muskuraana Dil Churaana" – Aabroo

See also
 Mangeshkar Family

References

External links 

 
 http://www.planetradiocity.com/musicopedia/music_newupdatearticle.php?conid=1922

Living people
Indian women playback singers
20th-century Indian singers
Singers from Mumbai
Marathi playback singers
Bollywood playback singers
Marathi-language singers
Goan people
20th-century Indian women singers
20th-century Indian composers
Mangeshkar family
Women musicians from Maharashtra
20th-century women composers
1931 births